The piccolo oboe, also known as the piccoloboe and historically called an oboe musette (or just musette), is the smallest and highest pitched member of the oboe family.  Pitched in E or F above the regular oboe (i.e. notated a minor third or perfect fourth lower than sounding), the piccolo oboe is a sopranino version of the oboe, comparable to the E clarinet. It is most commonly found in early 20th-century marching band music, and the occasional rare chamber music ensembles or contemporary compositions.

(Note: This musical instrument should not be confused with the similarly named musette de cour, which is bellows-blown and characterized by a drone.)

Makers 

Piccolo oboes are produced by the French makers F. Lorée (pitched in F) and Marigaux (pitched in E♭), as well as the Italian firm Fratelli Patricola (pitched in E♭). Lorée calls its instrument piccolo oboe or oboe musette (in F), while Marigaux and Patricola call their instruments simply oboe musette.  , a new instrument typically sold for US$9,000.

Repertoire 
The instrument has found the most use in chamber and contemporary music, where it is valued for its unusual tone colour. It is also employed in double-reed ensembles such as Amoris, and in film scoring. Perhaps the best-known pieces requiring piccolo oboe are Solo for Oboe Instruments (1971) and Concerto for Oboe and Orchestra No. 2, both by Bruno Maderna, Vérifications by Samuel Andreyev, and Ar-Loth (1967) by Paolo Renosto.

Other contemporary works for the instrument are Scherzo Furioso by William Blezard, Tasmanian Ants by Ian Keith Harris, Iberian Improvisations and Bailables by Leonard Salzedo, Variations on a Sicilian Shepherd Tune by Clive Strutt.

Two concerti have been written featuring the piccolo oboe in addition to the other four members of the oboe family, these works being David Stock's "Oborama" and James Stephenson's "Rituals and Dances," both written for Alex Klein.

See also
Oboe
Piccolo heckelphone

References

External links

F. Lorée page with description and photograph
Wayback archive of Amoris International Musette page
WIMA scores for oboe family instruments

Single oboes with conical bore